Alice's Spooky Adventure is a 1924 black-and-white silent short subject created by Walt Disney.

Plot
When a ball is accidentally knocked through the window of a neighbourhood haunted house, Alice is the only one brave enough to go inside to retrieve it. While she is in there she falls and bumps her head, sending her to a cartoon dreamworld in which she rescues a cat and battles some spirits in a ghost town. When she awakens, she retrieves the ball, only to find out that police have investigated the scene. The police chase Alice, believing her to be responsible for the scene, and arrest her.

Cast
 Virginia Davis as Alice
 Leon Holmes as the tubby Boy
 Spec O'Donnell as a boy

References

External links 
 

1924 short films
1924 animated films
1920s Disney animated short films
1920s ghost films
American silent short films
American black-and-white films
Films directed by Walt Disney
Alice Comedies
Animated films about cats
American ghost films
1924 comedy films
1924 films
Animated films without speech
1920s American films
Silent horror films